Allenia is a taxonomic plant genus synonym that may refer to:

Allenia  = Micrantheum
Allenia  = Radyera

References